The Annie Falconer was a two masted schooner that sank in Lake Ontario in November 1904. The Falconer was laden with soft coal to be delivered to Picton.

References

Maritime incidents in 1904
Shipwrecks of Lake Ontario
1867 ships
Great Lakes ships